Masatake (written: ,  or ) is a masculine Japanese given name. Notable people with the name include:

, Japanese daimyō
, Japanese handball player
, mathematician
, Japanese aviator and historian
, Japanese military officer, politician and Prime Minister of Japan

Japanese masculine given names